Synanthedon cruciati is a moth of the family Sesiidae that is endemic to southern Spain.

The larvae feed on Viscum cruciatum.

References

Moths described in 2002
Endemic fauna of Spain
Moths of Europe
Sesiidae